Benjamin Johnson (1742) was an English actor.

Bibliography
Johnson was first a scene painter, then acted in the provinces, and appeared in London in 1695 at Drury Lane after Thomas Betterton's defection. He was the original Captain Driver in Oronooko (1696), Captain Fireball in George Farquhar's Sir Harry Wildair (1701) and Sable in Richard Steele's The Funeral (1702); he was particularly well regarded as the First Gravedigger in Hamlet and as several characters in the plays of Ben Jonson. He also succeeded to Thomas Doggett's roles. In 1715 he starred in John Gay's hit comedy The What D'Ye Call It at Drury Lane.

References

1665 births
1742 deaths
17th-century English male actors
18th-century English male actors
17th-century English painters
English male painters
18th-century English painters
English scenic designers
English male stage actors
18th-century English male artists